Disco Elysium is a 2019 role-playing video game developed and published by ZA/UM. Inspired by Infinity Engine-era games, particularly Planescape: Torment, the game was written and designed by Estonian novelist Robert Kurvitz and features a distinctive oil painting art style with music by the English band British Sea Power.

Disco Elysium takes place in the seaside district of a fictional city still recovering from a siege which occurred decades prior to the game's start. Players take the role of an amnesiac detective who has been tasked with solving a murder mystery. During the investigation, he comes to recall events about his own past as well as current forces trying to affect the city. Disco Elysium was released for Windows in October 2019 and macOS in April 2020. An expanded version of the game featuring full voice acting and new content, subtitled The Final Cut, was released for consoles in 2021, alongside a free update for the PC and macOS versions.

Disco Elysium is a non-traditional role-playing game featuring very little combat. Instead, events are resolved through skill checks and dialogue trees via a system of 24 skills that represents different aspects of the protagonist, such as his perception and pain threshold. In addition, a system called the Thought Cabinet represents his other ideologies and personality traits, with players having the ability to freely support or suppress them. The game is based on a tabletop role-playing game setting that Kurvitz had previously created, later forming ZA/UM in 2016 to adapt it into a video game. Disco Elysium received universal acclaim for its narrative and art, and won a number of awards, including Game of the Year, by several publications. A television series adaptation was announced to be in development in 2020.

Gameplay

Disco Elysium is a role-playing video game that features an open world and dialogue-heavy gameplay mechanics. The game is presented in an isometric perspective in which the player character is controlled. The player takes the role of a detective, who suffers from alcohol and drug-induced amnesia, on a murder case. The player can move the detective about the current screen to interact with non-player characters (NPC) and highlighted objects or move onto other screens. Early in the game they gain a partner, Kim Kitsuragi, another detective who acts as the protagonist's voice of professionalism and who may be able to offer advice or support in certain dialogue options. Other NPCs may be influenced to become temporary companions that join the group and provide similar support.

The gameplay features no combat in the traditional sense; instead, it is handled through skill checks and dialogue trees. There are four primary abilities in the game: Intellect, Psyche, Physique, and Motorics. Each ability has six distinct secondary skills for a total of 24. The player improves these skills through skill points earned from leveling up. The choice of clothing that the player equips on the player-character can impart both positive and negative effects on certain skills. Upgrading these skills helps the player character pass skill checks, based on a random dice roll, but potentially result in negative effects and character quirks, discouraging minmaxing. For instance, a player character with high Drama may be able to detect and fabricate lies effectively, but may also become prone to hysterics and paranoia. Likewise, high Electrochemistry shields the player character from the negative effects of drugs and provides knowledge on them, but may also lead to substance abuse and other self-destructive behaviors.

Disco Elysium features a secondary inventory system known as the "Thought Cabinet". Thoughts are unlockable through conversations with other characters, as well as through internal dialogues within the mind of the player character himself. The player is then able to "internalize" a thought through a certain amount of in-game hours, which, once completed, grants the player character permanent benefits but also occasionally negative effects, a concept that ZA/UM compared to the trait system used in the Fallout series. A limited number of slots are available in the Thought Cabinet at the start, though more can be gained with experience levels. For example, an early possible option for the Thought Cabinet is the "Hobocop" thought, in which the character ponders the option of living on the streets to save money, which reduces the character's composure with other NPCs while the thought is internalized. When the character has completed the Hobocop thought, it allows them to find more junk on the streets that can be sold for money.

The 24 skills also play into the dialogue trees, creating a situation where the player-character may have an internal debate with one aspect of their mind or body, creating the idea that the player is communicating with a fragmented persona. These internal conversations may provide suggestions or additional insight that can guide the player into actions or dialogue with the game's non-playable characters, depending on the skill points invested into the skill. For example, the Inland Empire, a subskill of the Psyche, is described by ZA/UM as a representation of the intensity of the soul, and may come into situations where the player-character may need to pass themselves off under a fake identity with the conviction behind that stance, should the player accept this suggestion when debating with Inland Empire.

Synopsis

Setting 
Disco Elysium takes place in the fantastic realist world of Elysium, developed by Kurvitz and his team in the years prior, which includes over six thousand years of history. The game takes place in the year '51 of the Current Century, the setting's most modern period. Elysium is made of "isolas," masses of land and sea that are separated from each other by the Pale, an inscrutable, mist-like "connective tissue" in which the laws of reality break down. Prolonged exposure to the Pale can cause mental instability and eventually death, and traversing the Pale, which is typically done with aerostatics, is heavily regulated due to the danger.

The setting's political and cultural history is also markedly varied across its locations, containing numerous different factions. Nations and people within Disco Elysium generally follow four main ideologies: communism, fascism, moralism, and ultraliberalism. Communism, also called Mazovianism, was founded by an economist and historical materialist named Kras Mazov, and rather than being associated with the color red and the hammer and sickle, the ideology is instead represented by the color white and a pentagram flanked by a pair of deer antlers. Moralism, despite being a centrist ideology, carries religious overtones due to its association with Elysium's largest religion, Dolorianism. One of Dolorianism's dominant features is its "Innocences", saint-like figures who are said to be "embodiments of history" and wield great religious and political power during their lives, akin to the position of pope. The greatest and most influential among the six historical Innocences was Dolores Dei, a woman of mysterious origins who founded many of the world's modern institutions and spurred the first successful journeys between isolas about three centuries ago. Dolores Dei was also purported to have glowing lungs, and as a result the common symbol for love in Elysium is a set of lungs rather than a heart.

Events in the game take place in the impoverished district of Martinaise within the city of Revachol on the isola of Insulinde, the "New New World". Forty-nine years before the events of the game, a wave of communist revolutions swept multiple countries; the Suzerainty of Revachol, a monarchy which up to that point had been Elysium's preeminent superpower, was overthrown and replaced by a commune. Six years later, the Commune of Revachol was toppled by an invading alliance of moralist-capitalist nations called "the Coalition". Revachol was designated a Special Administrative Region and remains firmly under Coalition control decades later. One of the few governmental responsibilities that the Coalition concedes to the people of Revachol is policing, which is carried out by the Revachol Citizens Militia (RCM), a voluntary citizens' brigade turned semi-professional police force.

Plot 
The player character wakes up in a trashed hostel room in Martinaise with a severe hangover and no memory of his own identity. He meets Lieutenant Kim Kitsuragi, who informs him that they have been assigned to investigate the death of a hanged man in an empty lot behind the hostel. The victim's identity is unclear and initial analysis of the scene indicates that he was lynched by a group of people. The detectives explore the rest of the district, following up on leads while helping residents with a variety of tasks. In the course of the investigation, the player character learns that he is a decorated RCM detective, Lieutenant Double-Yefreitor (meaning he twice declined promotion from his current rank) Harrier "Harry" Du Bois. Harry experienced an event several years ago that began a mid-life crisis, and on the night he was assigned to the hanged man case he finally snapped and embarked on a self-destructive three-day bender around Martinaise.

Harry and Kim discover the hanged man killing is connected to an ongoing strike by the Martinaise dockworkers' union against the Wild Pines Group, a major logistics corporation. They interview union boss Evrart Claire and Wild Pines negotiator Joyce Messier. Joyce reveals that the hanged man was Colonel Ellis "Lely" Kortenaer, the commander of a squad of mercenaries sent by Wild Pines to break the strike. She warns that the rest of the mercenaries have gone rogue and will likely seek retribution for Lely's death.

Harry and Kim then uncover that Lely was killed before the hanging, and the Hardie Boys, a group of dockworkers who act as vigilantes, claim responsibility for the murder. They assert that Lely attempted to rape a hostel guest named Klaasje. When questioned, Klaasje reveals that Lely was shot in the mouth while the two were having consensual sex. Unable to figure out the origin of the bullet and fearful of the authorities due to her past as a corporate spy, Klaasje enlisted the help of a truck driver and union sympathizer named Ruby, who staged Lely's hanging with the rest of the Hardie Boys. The detectives find Ruby hiding in an abandoned building, where she incapacitates them with a radio wave-based device normally used to aid in traversing the Pale. She claims that the cover-up was Klaasje's idea and has no idea who shot Lely. Harry manages to either resist or disable the Pale device and tries to arrest Ruby, but she believes Harry to be a corrupt cop and either escapes or kills herself.

The detectives then stumble across a standoff between the rogue mercenaries and the Hardie Boys. A firefight breaks out and Harry is wounded, leaving him unconscious for several days. Most or all the mercenaries are killed in the incident, and Kim may also be hospitalized, in which case street urchin Cuno offers to take his place as Harry's partner. The detectives chase down their remaining leads and determine that the shot that killed Lely came from an old fortress on an isle just off of Martinaise's shoreline.

The detectives explore the ruins and find the shooter, a former commissar of the Revachol communist army named Iosef Lilianovich Dros. Iosef reveals that he shot Lely with his sniper rifle in a fit of anger and jealousy; his motivations were born out of his bitterness towards the capitalist system Lely represented, as well as sexual envy for Klaasje. The detectives arrest him for the murder. At this point, an insectoid cryptid known as the Insulindian Phasmid appears from the reeds. It is revealed the Phasmid indirectly set off the chain of events leading to the murder, as its presence near the fort where the oblivious Iosef lived inadvertently affected the man's mind for years, stoking his zealotry and resentment. Harry may have a psychic conversation with the Phasmid, who tells him that it is fearful of the notion of his unstable mind, but awed by his ability to continue existing. It comforts Harry, telling him to move on from the wreck of his life.

Harry and his partner are confronted by his old squad upon their return to Martinaise. They reflect on Harry's actions during the game, particularly whether he solved the case and how he handled the mercenaries. Lieutenant Jean Vicquemare, Harry's usual partner, confirms that Harry's emotional breakdown was the result of his fiancé leaving him years ago. In the best possible outcome, the squad expresses hope that Harry's state will improve in the future, and invites him and either Kim or Cuno to join a special RCM unit.

Development
Disco Elysium was developed by ZA/UM, a company founded in 2016 by Estonian novelist Robert Kurvitz, who served as the game's lead writer and designer. Kurvitz since 2001 had been part of a band called Ultramelanhool, and in 2005, while in Tallinn, Estonia, with the group struggling for finances, conceived of a fictional world during a drunken evening while listening to Tiësto's "Adagio for Strings". Feeling they had a solid idea, the group created a collective of artists and musicians, which included oil painter Aleksander Rostov, to expand upon the work of that night and developed a tabletop RPG based on Dungeons & Dragons on this steampunk-like concept. During this period, Kurvitz met Estonian author Kaur Kender who helped him to write a novel set in this world, Sacred and Terrible Air, which was published in 2013 but only sold about one thousand copies. Kurvitz fell into a period of depression and alcoholism for about three years following the book's failing.

Kurvitz eventually managed to overcome this period of alcoholism and helped Kender to also overcome his own alcoholism. As a sign of gratitude, Kender suggested to Kurvitz that instead of pursuing a novel, that he try capturing his world as a video game instead as to draw a larger interest. Kurvitz had no experience in video games before, but once he had seen artwork of the game's setting of Revachol as easily fitting into an isometric format, as well as Rostov's agreement that they might as well continue taking the risk of failing on a video game together, Kurvitz proceeded with the idea. Kurvitz wrote a concise description of what the game would be: "D&D meets '70s cop-show, in an original 'fantastic realist' setting, with swords, guns and motor-cars. Realised as an isometric CRPG – a modern advancement on the legendary Planescape: Torment and Baldur's Gate. Massive, reactive story. Exploring a vast, poverty-stricken ghetto. Deep, strategic combat." Kender was impressed by the strong statement, investing into the game's development, with additional investment coming from friends and family. The game was announced as an upcoming 2017 game under the title No Truce With the Furies, taken from the poem "Reflections" by R.S. Thomas and published in Thomas' No Truce with the Furies in 1995.

Kurvitz established the ZA/UM team to create the game, using the name "za um", a reference to the Zaum constructed language created by Russian avant-garde poets in the early 1900s. Its name can be read in Russian as either "for the mind" or "from the mind", while the use of all-capitals and the slash to present the team as "something that definitely exists and weighs eight tonnes". Work on the game started around 2016, with the local team living in a squat in a former gallery in Tallinn. They were able to secure venture capital into the game during that first year which allowed Kurvitz to seek out the English band British Sea Power for their music for the game's soundtrack. While in Birmingham to speak to the band, Kurvitz realised England was a better location for the main development team as there were more local resources for both development and for voice-overs. During development, some of the staff relocated from Estonia to London and Brighton, with other designers working out of Poland, Romania, and China. Overall, by the time of the game's release, ZA/UM had about 20 outside consultants and 35 in-house developers, with a team of eight writers assisting Kurvitz in the game's dialogue. The majority of the game's funding was provided by Estonian businessman Margus Linnamäe. The game uses the Unity engine.

As originally planned, the game was to focus on action in a single city location to make the 2017 release. However, as ZA/UM had indicated to investors that this was to be a game that spanned a larger world, they found the need to spread beyond that single location, forcing them to delay the game's release, along with the name change to Disco Elysium. This title plays on a few double meanings related to the word "disco"; in one sense, it refers to ideas that briefly gain the spotlight before burning out similar to the fad of disco music, and reflected in the protagonist's clothing style, while in a more literal sense, "disco" is Latin for "I learn", thus reflecting on the protagonist's overcoming his amnesia to learn about the world of Elysium. Kurvitz had always anticipated the No Truce title to be more of a working title and wanted to reserve it for when they had bundled Disco Elysium with a second planned game. Though ZA/UM had initially planned to publish the game through Humble Bundle, they ultimately chose to self-publish it.

Design, voices, and influences
The game's art, drawn mostly in a painterly style, was led by Aleksander Rostov, while the game's soundtrack was written by the English band British Sea Power. The voice-acting cast includes metal musicians Mikee Goodman of SikTh and Mark Holcomb of Periphery. The original release also had voice-acting by Dasha Nekrasova of the cultural commentary podcast Red Scare and four of the hosts from the political satire podcast Chapo Trap House, but these would later be replaced in The Final Cut.

ZA/UM cited several works that influenced the writing and style of Disco Elysium. One major influence is the 1999 video game Planescape: Torment, which, like Disco Elysium, features an amnesiac player character, heavily emphasises dialogue, and is rendered isometrically. The television show The Wire was also used as an influence for the game's working class setting, while Émile Zola's writings shared stories on the misery of human life that narrative writer Helen Hindpere said they felt resonated within the game. Other works that influenced Disco Elysium included the video game Kentucky Route Zero; television shows True Detective and The Shield; the literary works of Dashiell Hammett, China Miéville, and the Strugatsky brothers; and artists Rembrandt, Ilya Repin, Jenny Saville, Alex Kanevsky, and Wassily Kandinsky. The creators have also said that their work owes a lot to the Estonian urbanist poet Arvi Siig: "Without his modernism, Elysium – the world the game is placed in – would not be half of what it is," Kurvitz said while accepting the Estonian President's Young Cultural Figure annual award for 2020, adding that Siig's vision of an international, radical and humanist Estonian culture lives on in Disco Elysium.

Kurvitz said that an aim was to have a full, complex depth of choices and outcomes, limited by the practicalities of game development. Knowing they could not realistically cover all possible choices, Kurvitz and his team instead focused more on what he called "microreactivity", small acts and decisions the player may make such as an embarrassing comment, and how that may propagate throughout events. The dialogue of the player's various skills helped then to provide critique and internalization of how these small decisions had larger effects on the game world, so that the player would become more aware of such choices in the future. An additional factor in writing was the recognition that there was no real solution to the game; while the player may resolve some portions of the story, the primary case is nearly unworkable, similar to the rest of Revachol. They created the companion Kim as a no-nonsense character to help keep the player on track of resolving some part of the game and recognizing that there were some story threads they simply could not fix or resolve.

The Final Cut
An expanded and reworked edition of the game, subtitled The Final Cut, was announced in December 2020. According to lead writer Helen Hindpere, The Final Cut was directed based on input from players of the original game. It included complete voicework for the nearly 300 characters including the game's narration and the player-character skills, encompassing over 1.2 million words according to Hindpere. Because of the importance of the characters to the game, ZA/UM kept voice directing in-house rather than outsourcing the task as typically done with RPG games of this nature. It took about fourteen months to complete the global casting and recording processing for the additional voice overs. While they brought back some of the prior voice actors who had read introductory dialogue lines in conversation trees for their respective characters, ZA/UM sought out new voice actors they felt were a better fit for many roles, especially for minor characters. They came upon jazz musician Lenval Brown for the voice of the narrator and of the player skills, representing nearly half of the game's dialogue, and considered him essential to The Final Cut. Brown spent about eight months with the vocal directors in recording his lines, keeping his voice otherwise constant, slow and meticulous for all of the different characters skills since these were explaining things to the player, but including small nuances to try to distinguish the various facets of each skill's personality. The voice-acting by Nekrasova and the Chapo Trap House hosts was completely replaced. The Final Cut allows players the option to use a selection of voice acting for the game, such as only having the narrator's voiceover while the other characters presented as text.

There are four quests that were cut from the original game but reworked to explore some of the political implications of the game's story, now called Political Vision Quests. These quests were designed to encourage the player to consider how they have developed their player-character and where their decisions have taken the character, and how committed they are to seeing that out, according to Hindpere. Additionally, the expansion includes new art and animations, including two additional tracks from British Sea Power.

Release
Disco Elysium was first released for Windows on 15 October 2019. The macOS version was released on 27 April 2020. One of the first translations that ZA/UM published was the Chinese version, which was released in March 2020. Its release had to bypass the typical approval process needed to release games in China, since Disco Elysium's content, which included themes of communism, did not meet the Chinese governmental standards. After its release, reviews left by Chinese players indicated that they were drawn to the game, as its story reflected their own experiences with communism. In May 2020, ZA/UM released an update that improved some of the game's performance on lower-end hardware, as well as adding support for additional language translations, which are being developed by the community and by the localization firm Testronic Labs.

After its original release, Kurvitz announced plans for an expansion for the game as well a full sequel. In addition, a tabletop RPG based on the systems the game used, tentatively titled You Are Vapor, was also announced, with Kurvitz also announcing plans to translate his novel Sacred and Terrible Air in English, which narratively takes place 20 years after the events of Disco Elysium. In June 2020, it was announced that ZA/UM had partnered with production company dj2 Entertainment to develop a television series based on the game. ZA/UM launched a limited edition clothing and artwork line, Atelier, in March 2021, featuring pieces based on the game.

The Final Cut
The Final Cut was released on 30 March 2021 for PlayStation 4, PlayStation 5, and Stadia, and as a free update for existing copies of the game on PC and macOS. Versions for Nintendo Switch, Xbox One and Xbox Series X/S were released on 12 October 2021. While the original game was not submitted for rating for the Australian Classification Board as it was only released digitally for personal computers, the planned console release of The Final Cut required a Board review. The game was refused classification by the Board, making it illegal to sell in the country, due to its depiction of sex, drug misuse or addiction, crime, cruelty, and violence, as well as showing "revolting or abhorrent phenomena in such a way that they offend against the standards of morality, decency, and propriety generally accepted by reasonable adults". The ban was appealed by ZA/UM then subsequently dropped, with the game reclassified to an adults-only R18+ rating and allowed to be sold, as the Board acknowledged that the game provided disincentives related to drug-taking behavior where "regular drug use leads to negative consequences for the player's progression in the game". The game was released by Spike Chunsoft in Japan on 25 August 2022.

Reception

Disco Elysium received "universal acclaim" according to review aggregator Metacritic, with it being praised for its narrative and conversational systems. PC Gamer praised the game for its depth, freedom, customization, and storytelling and called it one of the best RPGs on the PC. IGN praised the game's open world and compared it favorably to The Witcher 3 and Red Dead Redemption 2, despite being much smaller. The Washington Post said that the game is "conspicuously well written". GameSpot awarded it a 10 out of 10, their first perfect score since 2017. PCGamesN wrote that the game set new genre standards for exploration and conversation systems. Conversely, Eurogamer criticized the game for not offering enough choice in role-playing and for a distinct lack of focus.

The Final Cut is the highest-rated PC game on Metacritic. It was re-reviewed by IGN and Game Informer, both of which praised the addition of voice lines and new quests. The PlayStation releases were initially found to have game-breaking bugs that made some of the quests impossible to finish.

In June 2020, ZA/UM and dj2 Entertainment announced that a television series based on the game was under development.

Awards
The game was nominated for four awards at The Game Awards 2019 and won all of them, the most at the event. Slant Magazine, USGamer, PC Gamer, and Zero Punctuation chose it as their game of the year, while Time included it as one of their top 10 games of the 2010s. The game was also nominated for the 2020 Nebula Award for Best Game Writing.

Legal issues
In October 2022, ZA/UM member Martin Luiga announced that he, Kurvitz, Rostov, and Hindpere of ZA/UM had "involuntarily left the company", stating that ZA/UM "no longer represents the ethos it was founded on." Luiga also affirmed that the ZA/UM cultural association had also been dissolved. In an interview, Luiga stated that the other three members had been fired under false premises. A spokesperson for ZA/UM stated that "Like any video game, the development of Disco Elysium was and still is a collective effort, with every team member's contribution essential and valued as part of a greater whole. At this time, we have no further comment to make other than the ZA/UM creative team's focus remains on the development of our next project, and we are excited to share more news on this with you all soon."

In early November 2022, conflicting reports of the events were announced. According to Kurvitz, Zaum Studio OÜ, the development studio, was originally owned in majority shares by Margus Linnamäe, was then acquired by Tütreke OÜ, a holding company owned by studio CEO Ilmar Kompus through a share purchase in 2021. Kurvitz and Rostov claimed that the funds used for that purchase were pulled from the studio itself, making it a fraudulent purchase, upon which they started to challenge the purchase and recover their IP from the studio. Kurvitz and Rostov discovered the change in how the company was organized, including their demotion, and were fired when they began raising questions. Kurvitz and Rostov argued that they still have some control of the Disco Elysium intellectual property rights, and thus should have had a say in blocking the sale. Zaum Studio dismissed the charges in a statement, and said that the former employees had been let go for creating a disruptive environment at the studio, claiming that the two had "limited to no engagement in their responsibility and work", as well as verbally abused and discriminated against other employees. Other employees of Zaum Studio speaking anonymously with GamesIndustry.biz claimed the situation lay between these points.

Legal proceedings in the matter were started by Kaur Kender, the executive producer of Disco Elysium. Kender had asked similar questions of the change in Zaum's management, leading to his firing. He filed suit asserting that Kompus owed him . Kender further asserted that Kompus was aided by Tõnis Haavel, an Estonian investor that had been convicted of fraud and was already  in debt. Haavel has a majority share in Yessirnosir Ltd., a United Kingdom subsidiary of Zaum where the Disco Elysium rights are held. An initial hearing in Kender's case, which included statements from Kurvitz, was held in October 2022. By December 2022, Kender had dropped his lawsuit, as Kompus had paid back  from Tütreke back to ZA/UM. Kurvitz and Rostov still assert that there were illegal actions to take over the development studio leading to their ouster.

The studio issued a statement on 14 March 2023 stating that all legal actions from the former members were concluded. Of Kender, he had "divested all his shares in the studio, repaid all his debts to the studio", and paid for the studio's legal fees under court order. Of Kurvitz and Rostov, the studio alleged that their lawsuit was dropped due to a lack of evidence. Further details of these cases were left under confidence. However, on 17 March 2023, Kurvitz and another former ZA/UM creative, Sandor Taal, responded to this statement by clarifying that the announcement was "wrong and misleading in several respects" and "[sought] to unfairly paint [them] - the remaining minority shareholders in ZA/UM - as mere disgruntled employees." Kurvitz and Taal also stated that their lawsuit regarding employment claims against the studio was dismissed "as part of a larger campaign against [them]" and that they plan to "pursue legal options accordingly."

References

External links
 
 

2019 video games
British Academy Games Award for Debut Game winners
Detective video games
Fiction about substance abuse
The Game Awards winners
Game Developers Choice Award winners
Interactive Achievement Award winners
MacOS games
Neo-noir video games
Nintendo Switch games
Open-world video games
Organized crime video games
PlayStation 4 games
PlayStation 5 games
Political video games
Role-playing video games
Single-player video games
Stadia games
Video games about amnesia
Video games about police officers
Video games developed in Estonia
Video games developed in the United Kingdom
Video games with alternate endings
Video games with isometric graphics
Windows games
Xbox One games
Xbox Series X and Series S games